The Assistant Secretary of the Army (Manpower and Reserve Affairs) — abbreviated ASA(M&RA) — is a civilian official in the United States Department of the Army.

U.S. law provides that there shall be five Assistant Secretaries of the Army "appointed from civilian life by the President, by and with the advice and consent of the Senate."  "One of the Assistant Secretaries shall be the Assistant Secretary of the Army for Manpower and Reserve Affairs. He shall have as his principal duty the overall supervision of manpower and reserve component affairs of the Department of the Army.  Pursuant to United States Army General Order No. 3, the Assistant Secretary of the Army (Manpower and Reserve Affairs) supervises Army strategy, policy, programs, and compliance related to functions such as recruiting, readiness and mobilization, civilian and military manpower, medical and health affairs, family and Morale, Welfare and Recreation, the review of soldier records, force structure policy, manpower analysis, the Army-wide Equal Employment Opportunity Program and critical matters pertaining to Reserve Affairs.

The office can be traced to 1950, when United States Secretary of the Army Gordon Gray decided to centralize manpower issues for civil, military, and reserve personnel under one individual, with the position being elevated to Assistant Secretary when manpower issues proved to be a problem during the course of the Korean War.  The office was then abolished in 1961, with its duties transferred to the Office of the Under Secretary of the Army, but then re-established - this time by statute - in 1968.

List of assistant secretaries

References

United States Army civilians
United States Army organization